Devanga Jagadguru Maharaj Sri Sri Sri Dayanandapuri Mahaswamiji is a leader of the community and abbot of Gayathri Peedam (monastery) Hemakooda - Hampi, Karnataka, India.

References

External links 
Guru Visit
Inaugurate Devanga Tower
devangar valipadu
Devanga Trust inauguration at AP
Devanga Sanga inauguration By Karnataka CM
 Dhayanathapuri swamiji 

Year of birth missing (living people)
Living people
Indian religious leaders